Marian Pleașcă (born 6 February 1990) is a Romanian professional footballer who plays as a right back for Pandurii Târgu Jiu .

Honours

Club
Pandurii Târgu Jiu
Liga I: Runner-up 2013

Career statistics

Club

Statistics accurate as of match played 17 May 2018

References

External links
 
 

1990 births
Living people
People from Caracal, Romania
Romanian footballers
Association football midfielders
Liga I players
Liga II players
CS Pandurii Târgu Jiu players
FC Steaua București players
FC Voluntari players
CS Gaz Metan Mediaș players
FC UTA Arad players
Romania international footballers
Romania under-21 international footballers